The Garden River is the name of several rivers and places in Canada:
 Garden River (Ontario) in Ontario
 Garden River, Alberta in Alberta
 Garden River 14, Ontario, a First Nations reserve
 Rural Municipality of Garden River No. 490 in Saskatchewan